Asir Rural District is a rural district (dehestan) in Asir District, Mohr County, Fars Province, Iran. At the 2006 census, its population (including Asir, which was subsequently detached from the rural district and promoted to city status) was 8,553, in 1,758 families; excluding Asir, the population in 2006 was 6,372, in 1,293 families.  The rural district has 18 villages.

References 

Rural Districts of Fars Province
Mohr County